Brian O'Meara (born 1973) is an Irish hurler who played as a left corner-forward for the Tipperary senior team.

O'Meara joined the team during the 1994 championship and was a regular member of the starting fifteen until his retirement a decade later. During that time he won one Munster winners' medal and two National Hurling League winners' medals. O'Meara was denied an All-Ireland winners' medal in 2001 having been ruled out of the final for receiving a red card in the semi-final.

At club level O'Meara is a one-time county club championship medalist plays with Mullinahone.

References

 

1973 births
Living people
Mullinahone hurlers
Tipperary inter-county hurlers
Munster inter-provincial hurlers